Langon-sur-Cher (literally Langon on Cher; before 2017: Langon) is a commune in the Loir-et-Cher department of central France.

Geography
The Rère forms part of the commune's northern border.

Population

See also
Communes of the Loir-et-Cher department

References

Communes of Loir-et-Cher